Wenda may refer to:

People
Benny Wenda
Mathias Wenda
Wenda Millard
Wenda Nel

Fictional characters
Wenda (Where's Waldo)